Jack Young may refer to:
Jack Young (Australian rules footballer) (1908−1979), Australian rules footballer
Jack Young (cricketer) (1912−1993), English cricketer
Jack Young (Gaelic footballer) (1887−?), Irish Gaelic footballer
Jack Young (footballer, born 1895) (1895−1952), English footballer
Jack Young (politician) (born 1954), mayor of Baltimore, Maryland
Jack Young (Scottish footballer) ( 1906−07), footballer who played for Kilmarnock and Bristol Rovers
Jack Young (speedway rider) (1925−1987), Australian speedway rider
Jack N. Young (1926−2018), American stunt performer and film location manager
John Hardin Young ( 1973–2017), American attorney
Jack Young (footballer, born 2000), English footballer

See also
Jock Young (1942–2013), British criminologist
Jackie Young (disambiguation)
John Young (disambiguation)